Giovanni Piccolomo (born on 4th April 1994, in São Paulo), sometimes known as just Giovanni, is a Brazilian footballer who plays as an attacking midfielder for Romanian Liga I club FC U Craiova 1948.

Career
Giovanni Piccolomo was on the squad of Corinthians in the 2012 Copa São Paulo de Futebol Júnior. He was also part of the squad who won the 2012 FIFA Club World Cup and 2013 Campeonato Paulista. Whilst under contract with Corinthians, he was loaned out several times. Firstly, to Ponte Preta in June 2013 for 2013 Campeonato Brasileiro Série B. Then to Portuguesa in 2014 for 2014 Campeonato Paulista, where he stayed only two months before returning to Corinthians. In 2015 he appeared at first for São Bento in 2015 Campeonato Paulista, and then for Athletico Paranaense in 2015 Campeonato Brasileiro Série A. For the last 6 months of his Corinthians contract he was loaned to Tigres do Brasil and played in 2016 Campeonato Carioca.

With his Corinthians contract over, Giovanni Piccolomo signed for a second time with São Bento in July 2016, agreeing a contract until the end of the 2016 Campeonato Brasileiro Série D. He played in six of the second phase games, scoring twice, helping São Bento gain promotion and agreeing to stay at the club in 2017.

In May 2017, Giovanni Piccolomo joined Náutico to play in 2017 Campeonato Brasileiro Série B. After playing 21 times he asked for contract to be terminated. According to his manager this was due to personal problems, but Giovanni himself blamed lack of payment of wages.

In December 2017 he signed for Goiás. His 33 appearances and 5 goals helped the club win promotion from 2018 Campeonato Brasileiro Série B, but a new contract could not be agreed and he signed for Coritiba in January 2019.

Honours
Corinthians
 FIFA Club World Cup: 2012
 Campeonato Paulista: 2013

Ponte Preta
 Copa Sudamericana runner-up: 2013

Goiás
 Campeonato Goiano : 2018

Coritiba
 Campeonato Paranaense runner-up : 2018

Avaí
Campeonato Catarinense: 2021

Cruzeiro
Campeonato Mineiro runner-up: 2022

Career statistics

References

External links
 Player profile 
 
 

1994 births
Living people
People from Sorocaba
Brazilian footballers
Brazilian people of Italian descent
Brazil youth international footballers
Association football midfielders
Campeonato Brasileiro Série A players
Campeonato Brasileiro Série B players
Campeonato Brasileiro Série D players
Sport Club Corinthians Paulista players
Associação Atlética Ponte Preta players
Associação Portuguesa de Desportos players
Esporte Clube São Bento players
Club Athletico Paranaense players
Esporte Clube Tigres do Brasil players
Clube Náutico Capibaribe players
Goiás Esporte Clube players
Coritiba Foot Ball Club players
Cruzeiro Esporte Clube players
Avaí FC players
Sport Club do Recife players
Brazilian expatriate footballers
Expatriate footballers in Romania
Brazilian expatriate sportspeople in Romania
Liga I players
FC U Craiova 1948 players
Footballers from São Paulo (state)